The Minister of Civil Aviation and Tourism is the minister in charge of the Ministry of Civil Aviation and Tourism in the Government of Bangladesh. He is also the minister of all departments and agencies under the Ministry of Civil Aviation and Tourism. In September 1962, a department called Biman Paribahan was formed. A separate ministry, the Ministry of Shipping, Inland Water Transport and Tourism, was later formed, but in January 1986, the ministry was transformed into a division of the Ministry of Communications. In December 1986, a ministry called the Ministry of Civil Aviation and Tourism was created.

On March 24, 1972, it was transformed into a single division under the Ministry of Defense. On 8 July 1986, the Ministry of Civil Aviation and Tourism was re-established as an independent ministry. Listed here are all the ministers, advisors, state ministers and deputy ministers.

Office holders

References 

Ministry of Civil Aviation and Tourism (Bangladesh)
Government ministers of Bangladesh
Lists of ministers by ministry of Bangladesh